Michael Armanini is an American politician serving as a member of the Pennsylvania House of Representatives from the 75th district. Elected in November 2020, he assumed office on December 1, 2020.

Early life and education 
Armanini was born in Kersey, Pennsylvania and graduated from Elk County Catholic High School in 1981. He earned a Bachelor of Science degree in business administration from Clarion University of Pennsylvania in 1985.

Career 
Armanini began his career in the metallurgy industry in 1987, working for Laurel Manufacturing. In 1997, he co-founded Product Assurance Services and Proform Powdered Metals. In 2015, after leaving the metallurgy industry, he became the headmaster of the Central Catholic High School. He was elected to the Pennsylvania House of Representatives in November 2020 and assumed office on December 1, 2020.

Personal life 
Armanini lives in Treasure Lake, Pennsylvania with his wife, Valerie, and their two children.

References 

Living people
People from Elk County, Pennsylvania
Clarion University of Pennsylvania alumni
Republican Party members of the Pennsylvania House of Representatives
Year of birth missing (living people)